James Robb Scott (11 February 1882 – 1965) was a Scottish architect who became the Chief Architect of the Southern Railway.

He was born on 11 February 1882 in the Gorbals, Glasgow, the son of Andrew Robb Scott (architect) and Mary Fletcher. He was articled to Leadbetter and Fairley in Edinburgh and afterwards moved to Belcher and Joass in London where he was promoted to chief architectural assistant.

He joined the London and South Western Railway in 1907. He is noted as the chief architectural assistant in the period of the reconstruction of Waterloo Station between 1909 and 1923. The engineers J. W. Jacomb-Hood and Alfred Weeks Szlumper had designed the roof and platforms. Scott was responsible for the office range and the main entrance and war memorial to the fallen employees of the Railway known as the Victory Arch. Sometime early in the evolution of the Southern Railway he was appointed chief architect.

He died in 1965.

Works

References

20th-century Scottish architects
1882 births
1965 deaths
British railway architects
Southern Railway (UK) people